Bangalore Raptors was a tennis team representing the city of Bangalore in 2014 Champions Tennis League.

The team is owned by Mittu Chandilya and the players representing this team were Thomas Enqvist, Feliciano Lopez, Venus Williams, Ramkumar Ramanathan, Sowjanya Bavisetty, vishwaa arumugam, Vinod Cheruku Vasisht.

References

Tennis teams in India
Sports teams in Karnataka
Sport in Bangalore
2014 establishments in Karnataka
Sports clubs established in 2014